HR 4458 is a binary star system in the equatorial constellation of Hydra. It has the Gould designation 289 G. Hydrae; HR 4458 is the Bright Star Catalogue designation. At a distance of 31.13 light years, it is the closest star system to the Solar System within this constellation. This object is visible to the naked eye as a dim, orange-hued star with an apparent visual magnitude of 5.97. It is moving closer to the Earth with a heliocentric radial velocity of −22 km/s.

The primary component is K-type main-sequence star with a stellar classification of K0 V. It is around five billion years old with 84% of the Sun's radius. The star is radiating 37% of the Sun's luminosity from its photosphere at an effective temperature of 5,241 K. It has been examined for the presence of an infrared excess, but none was detected.

This is a white dwarf star with a classification of DC8.

References

External links
 

K-type main-sequence stars
HR, 4458
White dwarfs
Binary stars
Hydra (constellation)
CD-32 08179
Crateris, 20
0432
Hydrae, 289
100623
056452
4458